Ivan Lukyanov may refer to:

 Ivan Lukyanov (athlete) (born 1981), Moldovan/Russian steeplechase runner
 Ivan Lukyanov (footballer) (born 1990), Russian football player